Athena, in comics, may refer to:

 Athena (DC Comics), a DC Comics character, Pallas Athena
 Athena (Marvel Comics), a Marvel Comics character and member of the Olympian Gods
 Thena, another Marvel Comics character who has gone by the name Athena, a member of the Eternals
 Athena, an Image Comics character, Lily Nalin, and member of Bloodstrike
 Athena, a Marvel UK character and member of the Warheads
 Athena, a comic book series from Dynamite Entertainment

See also
Athena (disambiguation)